The 1927–28 UCLA Grizzlies men's ice hockey season was the 2nd season of play for the program.

Season
Fresh off of their first official season, and an undefeated one no less, UCLA was slated to play their first game against USC. The game was delayed, however, and the team played a familiar opponent to begin their season, Occidental. The team lost its first game in two years and followed that up with a second consecutive defeat, putting them in a poor position right at the start. With so few games on their schedule, UCLA couldn't afford to lose any more and the team recovered with a hard fought win in game 3. The two early losses, and USC's dominance over Occidental, meant that UCLA could only hope for a tie with the Trojans for the crown but that could only happen if the Grizzlies won each of their remaining 3 games.

In the pivotal game with Southern California, the Trojans got out to a 2-goal lead but UCLA was able to tie the game and make it look like they had a chance for a time. Unfortunately the attack from USC was to strong and the Grizzlies surrendered 6 goals, handing the city championship over to the Trojans. After a second loss to Occidental, the team's lineup was changed with Tafe dropping back to defense (where he had played the year before) and Al Johnson jumping up to the forward position. The game was delayed when USC got the date wrong and didn't show up to the game. The Grizzlies could have claimed a win on a forfeit but the team refused to do so. It was rescheduled for a week later but eventually cancelled.

Artemus Lane served as team manager.

Note: UCLA used the same colors as UC-Berkley until 1949.

Roster

Standings

Schedule and Results

|-
!colspan=12 style=";" | Regular Season

References

UCLA Bruins men's ice hockey seasons
UCLA
UCLA
UCLA
UCLA